The petite rivière Jean-Boivin is a freshwater tributary of the Jean-Boivin River, flowing in the unorganized territory of Lac-Ministuk, in the Le Fjord-du-Saguenay Regional County Municipality, in the administrative region of Saguenay–Lac-Saint-Jean, in province of Quebec, in Canada. The upper course of the little Jean-Boivin river crosses the Laurentides Wildlife Reserve.

The valley of the "petite rivière Jean-Boivin" is located between route 175 and route 169; other secondary forest roads have been developed in the sector for forestry and recreational tourism activities.

Forestry is the primary economic activity in the sector; recreational tourism, second.

The surface of the small Jean-Boivin river is usually frozen from the end of November to the beginning of April, however the safe circulation on the ice is generally made from mid-December to the end of March.

Geography 
The main watersheds neighboring the little Jean-Boivin river are:
 north side: Jean-Boivin River, Cyriac River, McDonald Lake, McDonald Creek, Patrie Creek, Kenogami Lake, Saguenay River;
 east side: Jean-Boivin River, Cyriac River, Hector stream, Normand River;
 south side: Petite rivière Pikauba, the Grand Ruisseau, Pikauba River;
 west side: Pikauba River, la Blague stream.

The "Petite rivière Jean-Boivin" takes its source from an unidentified lake. The northern mouth of this head lake is located at:
  west of the Jean-Boivin River;
  north-east of a curve of the Petite rivière Pikauba;
  south of Kénogami Lake;
  south-west of route 175;
  south-west of the confluence of the small Jean-Boivin river and the Jean-Boivin river.

  towards the north-east, curving towards the north-east, up to a bend in a river where a stream (coming from the south-east) flows there;
  to the north, forming a curve to the east, to a stream (coming from the northwest);
  towards the northeast, curving towards the east, to its mouth.

The "Petite rivière Jean-Boivin" flows into a bend on the west bank of the Jean-Boivin River. This confluence is located at:
  south-east of the confluence of the Jean-Boivin River and the Cyriac River;
  west of route 175;
  southwest of Simoncouche Lake;
  north-east of the confluence of the Pikauba River and the Petite rivière Pikauba;
  south-east of the confluence of the Cyriac River and Kenogami Lake;
  south-west of the barrage de Portage-des-Roches;
  south-west of the confluence of the Chicoutimi River and the Saguenay river.

Toponymy 
The toponym "Petite rivière Jean-Boivin" was formalized on June 1, 1971, at the Place Names Bank of the Commission de toponymie du Québec.

See also 
 Le Fjord-du-Saguenay Regional County Municipality
 Lac-Ministuk, a TNO
 Laurentides Wildlife Reserve
 Jean-Boivin River
 Cyriac River
 Kenogami Lake
 Chicoutimi River
 Saguenay River
St. Lawrence River
 List of rivers of Quebec

References 

Rivers of Saguenay–Lac-Saint-Jean
Le Fjord-du-Saguenay Regional County Municipality
Laurentides Wildlife Reserve